Sardinian wine is Italian wine produced on the island of Sardinia.

Grape varieties

Albaranzeuli bianco
Albaranzeuli nero
Arvesiniadu
Barbera Sarda
Bovale
Cannonau (Grenache)
Girò
Greco nero
Malvasia
Monica
Moscato
Nasco
Nuragus
Pascale di Cagliari
Vermentino
Vernaccia di Oristano

DOC/G zones

Alghero, produced in the province of Sassari.
Arborea, produced in the province of Oristano.
Campidano di Terralba, produced in the provinces of Cagliari and Oristano.
Cannonau di Sardegna, produced throughout the island.
Carignano del Sulcis, produced in the province of Cagliari.
Girò di Cagliari, produced in the provinces of Cagliari and Oristano.
Malvasia di Bosa, produced in the province of Nuoro.
Malvasia di Cagliari, produced in the provinces of Cagliari and Oristano.
Mandrolisai, produced in the provinces of Nuoro and Oristano.
Monica di Cagliari, produced in the provinces of Cagliari and Oristano.
Monica di Sardegna, produced throughout the island.
Moscato di Cagliari, produced in the provinces of Cagliari and Oristano.
Moscato di Sardegna, produced throughout the island.
Moscato di Sorso Sennori, produced in the province of Sassari.
Nasco di Cagliari, produced in the provinces of Cagliari and Oristano.
Nuragus di Cagliari, produced in the provinces of Cagliari, Nuoro and Oristano.
Sardegna Semidano, produced throughout the island.
Vermentino di Gallura DOCG, produced in the provinces of Nuoro and Sassari.
Vermentino di Sardegna, produced throughout the island.
Vernaccia di Oristano, produced in the province of Oristano.

IGT zones

Barbagia, produced in the province of Nuoro.
Colli del Limbara, produced in the provinces of Sassari, Olbia-Tempio and Nuoro.
Isola dei Nuraghi. produced throughout the region of Sardegna
Marmilla, produced in the provinces of Cagliari and Oristano.
Nurra, produced in the province of Sassari.
Ogliastra, produced in the provinces of Cagliari and Nuoro.
Parteolla, produced in the province of Cagliari.
Planargia, produced in the provinces of Nuoro and Oristano.
Provincia di Nuoro, produced in the province of Nuoro.
Romangia, produced in the province of Sassari.
Sibiola, produced in the province of Cagliari.
Tharros, produced in the province of Oristano.
Trexenta, produced in the province of Cagliari.
Valle del Tirso, produced in the province of Oristano.
Valli di Porto Pino, produced in the province of Cagliari.

References

Wine regions of Italy
 
Wine of Sardinia